The American Inventors Protection Act (AIPA) is a United States federal law enacted on November 29, 1999, as Public Law 106-113.  In 2002, the Intellectual Property and High Technology Technical Amendments Act of 2002, Public Law 107-273, amended AIPA.

AIPA contains significant changes to American Patent Law. AIPA added 
 An "earlier invention" defense for business method patents – 35 U.S.C. §273;
 Publication of US patent applications for foreign published applications – 35 U.S.C. §122;
 Patent term restoration for delays caused by the Patent and Trademark Office – 35 U.S.C. §154;
 The Request for Continued Examination (RCE) patent prosecution procedure; and
 Disclosure requirements for invention promotion firms.

Political considerations
Large corporations generally supported the bill.  Independent inventors generally opposed the bill.

See also 
Patent Reform Act of 2005

References

Further reading
The American Inventor’s Protection Act: A Legislative History, Wake Forest Intellectual Property Law Journal
J. Richardson and K. Sibley, THE INTELLECTUAL PROPERTY AND COMMUNICATIONS OMNIBUS REFORM ACT OF 1999: an Overview for IP Practitioners, North Carolina Journal of Law & Technology

United States federal patent legislation
Acts of the 106th United States Congress